Wildflower are an Aboriginal rock/reggae band from Mamadawerre, Northern Territory, a remote 
outstation in Arnhem Land. They sing mostly in the Kunwinjku language and tell traditional stories with lyrics written by mentor Jill Nganjmirra. The band was a Next Crop artist on Triple J in 2006.

Discography

Albums

References

External links
Wildflower MySpace page

Northern Territory musical groups
Indigenous Australian musical groups